This is the list of countries by number of Internet hosts, based on 2012 figures from the CIA World Factbook. Several dependent territories, not fully recognized states, and non-state territories are also listed. The European Union host (.eu) is mostly composed of French, Polish and German hosts.


List
(*) The U.S. figure includes hosts in the .us, .mil, .gov, .edu, .com, .org, and .net domains.

See also
 Internet Census of 2012

References

Internet-related lists
Internet Hosts
IT infrastructure